Vibidia duodecimguttata is a species of ladybird beetle belonging to the family Coccinellidae, subfamily Coccinellinae.

Distribution
This species is present in most of Europe, in the eastern Palearctic realm, and in the Near East.

Description
These beetles have an oval shaped body. The light brown antennae are quite long. The elytra have a slightly wider side edge. Their entire body has a light brown basic color on the upper and lower side, only the eyes are black. Elytra show 12 whitish spots, six on each elytron (hence the Latin word , meaning twelve-spotted as if by drops). There is a whitish spot on both sides of the throat.

This species is rather similar to Calvia decemguttata and Halyzia sedecimguttata.

Biology
Adults can be encountered from April through September. This beetle is mycophagous, mainly feeding on the powdery mildew fungus (Oidium), diseases affecting some trees (including oak and hazel).

Gallery

References

External links
 Coleo-net

Coccinellidae
Beetles of Europe
Beetles described in 1761
Taxa named by Nikolaus Poda von Neuhaus